The Leftwich Trophy, also known as the Leftwich Award, is a trophy given for outstanding leadership and is an award presented annually in memory of Lieutenant Colonel William Groom Leftwich, United States Marine Corps, who was killed in action during the Vietnam War in November 1970.

Eligible nominees are Marine Captains in the ground combat element serving on active duty as a company or battery commander with the ground forces of the Fleet Marine Force at the time of nomination. Posthumous awards can be made of this award providing nomination complies with all the criteria for receiving the award. Selection is done by a board of senior officers chaired by the Deputy Commandant of Plans, Policy and Operations (DC, PP&O), who then after reviewing the applicants, makes recommendation to the Commandant of the Marine Corps for his final approval.

The trophy is provided to the Marine Corps through an endowment by the H. Ross Perot Foundation; Leftwich and Perot were classmates at the United States Naval Academy.

The Marine Corps bestowed the first posthumous Leftwich Trophy to Captain John W. Maloney, who was killed on 16 June 2005 when the unit he was leading was ambushed in a small town south of Ramadi, Iraq.

Recipients

References

External links 

1979 establishments in the United States
Awards and decorations of the United States Marine Corps
Awards established in 1979
Ross Perot
Trophies